Spisula is a genus of medium-sized to large marine bivalve mollusks or clams in the subfamily Mactrinae of the family Mactridae, commonly known as surf clams or trough shells.

Species
Species in the genus Spisula include:
 Spisula adamsi Olsson, 1961
 Spisula austini Lamprell & Whitehead, 1990
 †Spisula bernayi (Cossmann, 1886) 
 † Spisula brombachensis S. Schneider & Mandic, 2014 
 † Spisula couttsi Marwick, 1948 
 † Spisula crassitesta (Finlay, 1927) 
 Spisula discors (Gray, 1837)
 Spisula elliptica  (T. Brown, 1827) 
 Spisula murchisoni (Reeve, 1854)
 Spisula raveneli (Conrad, 1832)
 Spisula sachalinensis (Schrenck, 1862)
 Spisula solida (Linnaeus, 1758)    
 Spisula solidissima (Dillwyn, 1817) – Atlantic surfclam
 Spisula subtruncata (da Costa, 1778)  
 Spisula trigonella (Lamarck, 1818)
 † Spisula voyi (Gabb, 1866) 

Synonyms
 Spisula adelaidae Angas, 1865: synonym of Anapella cycladea (Lamarck, 1818)
 Spisula acquilateralis (Deshayes, 1854) – Triangle shell: synonym of Crassula aequilatera (Reeve, 1854)
 Spisula alaskana Dall, 1921: synonym of Mactromeris polynyma (Stimpson, 1860)
 Spisula aspersa (G. B. Sowerby I, 1825): synonym of Oxyperas aspersa (G. B. Sowerby I, 1825): synonym of Oxyperas aspersum'' (G. B. Sowerby I, 1825)
 Spisula belliana W. R. B. Oliver, 1915: synonym of Oxyperas belliana (W. R. B. Oliver, 1915): synonym of Oxyperas bellianum (W. R. B. Oliver, 1915)
 Spisula bernardi Pilsbry, 1904: synonym of Oxyperas bernardi (Pilsbry, 1904)
 Spisula camaronis Dall, 1921: synonym of Mactromeris hemphillii (Dall, 1894)
 Spisula catilliformis Conrad, 1867: synonym of Mactromeris catilliformis (Conrad, 1867)
 Spisula cretacea Angas, 1868: synonym of Spisula trigonella (Lamarck, 1818)
 Spisula dolabriformis Conrad, 1867: synonym of Simomactra dolabriformis (Conrad, 1867) (original combination)
 Spisula fragilis Gray, 1837: synonym of Standella pellucida (Gmelin, 1791)
 Spisula hemphillii (Dall, 1894): synonym of Mactromeris hemphillii (Dall, 1894)
 Spisula isabelleana (d'Orbigny, 1846): synonym of Mactra isabelleana d'Orbigny, 1846
 Spisula lamarckii Gray, 1837: synonym of Eastonia rugosa (Helbling, 1779)
 Spisula lentiginosa Gould, 1852: synonym of Oxyperas lentiginosa (Gould, 1852): synonym of Oxyperas lentiginosum (Gould, 1852)
 Spisula longa Dall, 1921: synonym of Tresus nuttallii (Conrad, 1837)
 Spisula marplatensis (Doello-Jurado, 1949): synonym of Mactra marplatensis Doello-Jurado, 1949
 Spisula ovalis (J. Sowerby, 1817) : synonym of Spisula solida (Linnaeus, 1758)  
 Spisula ovata Gray, 1843: synonym of Cyclomactra ovata (Gray, 1843)
 Spisula petitii (d'Orbigny, 1846): synonym of Mactra petitii d'Orbigny, 1846
 Spisula polynyma (Stimpson, 1860): synonym of Mactromeris polynyma (Stimpson, 1860)
 Spisula producta Angas, 1868: synonym of Spisula trigonella (Lamarck, 1818)
 Spisula richmondi (Dall, 1894): synonym of Mactra petitii d'Orbigny, 1846
 Spisula sayii Gray, 1837: synonym of Spisula raveneli (Conrad, 1832)
 Spisula solanderi J.E. Gray, 1837: synonym of Eastonia solanderi (J. E. Gray, 1837)
 Spisula strongi T. A. Burch, 1945: synonym of Simomactra planulata (Conrad, 1837)
 Spisula triangula (Brocchi, 1814): synonym of Spisula subtruncata (da Costa, 1778)
 Spisula vladivostokensis Bartsch, 1929: synonym of Mactromeris polynyma (Stimpson, 1860)
 Spisula voji [sic]: synonym of † Spisula voyi (Gabb, 1866) 
 Spisula williamsi (Berry, 1960): synonym of Spisula adamsi Olsson, 1961

References

 
 Marwick J. (1948). Lower Pliocene Mollusca from Otahuhu, Auckland. New Zealand Geological Survey Palaeontological Bulletin. 16: 38 pp., 8 pl.
 Coan, E. V.; Valentich-Scott, P. (2012). Bivalve seashells of tropical West America. Marine bivalve mollusks from Baja California to northern Peru. 2 vols, 1258 pp

External links
 Gray, J. E. (1837). A synoptical catalogue of the species of certain tribes or genera of shells contained in the collection of the British Museum and the author's cabinet. Magazine of Natural History, N.S. 1: 370-376
  Iredale, T. (1930). More notes on the marine Mollusca of New South Wales. Records of the Australian Museum. 17(9): 384-407, pls 62-65
  Gofas, S.; Le Renard, J.; Bouchet, P. (2001). Mollusca. in: Costello, M.J. et al. (eds), European Register of Marine Species: a check-list of the marine species in Europe and a bibliography of guides to their identification. Patrimoines Naturels. 50: 180-213

Mactridae
Bivalve genera
Taxa named by John Edward Gray